The 1990 Canadian Soccer League season was the fourth season of play for the Canadian Soccer League, a Division 1 men's soccer league in the Canadian soccer pyramid.

Format and changes from previous season
The Kitchener Spirit and London Lasers joined the Canadian Soccer League as an expansion teams for the 1990 season, with both joining the East Division. Meanwhile, the Calgary Strikers folded following the 1989 season.

As a result of those team changes, the league had a seven-team East Division and a four-team West Division. Consequently, the league did not have a balanced home and away schedule between conferences.  West Division teams played each other four times each, twice each home and away, while playing the East Division teams twice, once each home and away.  Eastern Division teams played other East Division teams three times, while playing the West Division teams twice, once each home and away.

The playoff format was also modified with eight teams (five from the East and three from the West) now qualifying for the post-season, as opposed to six in the previous years. The fifth place team from the East would cross over and play in the West Division playoff bracket. In addition, the playoff format was changed from an aggregate score system to a total points system. Teams would play a two-game series, with teams earning two points for a victory, one point for a draw, and zero points for a loss, regardless of the score. If the teams were tied on points (e.g. each team won a game, or both games were ties), then the first tiebreaker was the teams playing a thirty-minute mini-game.  If the mini-game resolved nothing, then penalty kicks were used as the second tiebreaker.  In the mini-game, each team named a new lineup, could include three more substitutes and re-activate any players who sat out of Game Two for caution accumulation.  Game Two home teams, the higher seeds, had an advantage as they had their entire 22-man active list available while away teams often traveled with as few as 14 players for economic reasons. The playoff final remained a one-off match, as in previous years, hosted by the top seed, or team with the best league record, in 1990.

Summary
Vancouver won their third consecutive West Division title, while Toronto won their second East Division title in a row. Once again, Vancouver and Hamilton met in the finals for the third consecutive season, with Vancouver winning the title for the third time in a row.

As 1989 league champions, the Vancouver 86ers competed in the North American Club Championship against the champions of the American Professional Soccer League, the Maryland Bays. Vancouver defeated Maryland 3–2 in the final played in Burnaby to capture the title.

Regular season

East Division

West Division

Overall table

Playoffs
The playoffs were conducted with a total points system. Teams earned two points for a win, one point for a draw, and zero points for a loss. The team with the most points following the two-game series advanced. If the teams were tied on points, they played a 30-minute mini-game for a bonus point, followed by a penalty shootout if the mini-game remained tied.

Quarterfinal 

Vancouver 86ers won the series 4–0 on points.

 

Victoria Vistas won the series in a shootout, after the series was tied 2–2 on points.

Hamilton Steelers won the series 4–0 on points.

Kitchener Spirit won the series in a shootout, after the series was tied 2–2 on points.

Semifinal 

Vancouver 86ers won the series 3–1 on points.

Hamilton Steelers won the series 3–1 on points.

Final

Statistics

Top scorers

Top goaltenders

Honours
The following awards and nominations were awarded for the 1990 season.

Awards

League All-Stars

Reserves

Front office

Average home attendances

Notes

References

External links
 Canadian Soccer League 1991 Media Guide and Statistics
 1990 CSL Stats

Canadian Soccer League
Canadian Soccer League (1987–1992) seasons